In chemistry, molybdenum bronze is a generic name for certain mixed oxides of molybdenum with the generic formula  where A may be hydrogen, an alkali metal cation (such as Li+, Na+, K+), and Tl+.  These compounds form deeply coloured plate-like crystals with a metallic sheen, hence their name.  These bronzes derive their metallic character from partially occupied 4d bands. The oxidation states in K0.28MoO3 are K+1, O2−, and Mo+5.72.  MoO3 is an insulator, with an unfilled 4d band.

These compounds have been much studied since the 1980s due to their markedly anisotropic electrical properties, reflecting their layered structure.  The electrical resistivity can vary considerably depending on the direction, in some cases by 200:1 or more.  They are generally non-stoichiometric compounds.  Some are metals and some are semiconductors.

Preparation 
The first report of a "molybdenum bronze" was by Alfred Stavenhagen and E. Engels in 1895. The first unambiguous synthesis of alkali molybdenum bronzes was reported only in 1964, by Wold and others. They obtained two potassium bronzes, "red"  and "blue" , by electrolysis of molten + at 550 °C and 560 °C, respectively. Sodium bronzes were also obtained by the same method. It was observed that at a slightly higher temperature (about 575 °C and above) only  is obtained.

Another preparation technique involves crystallization from the melt in a temperature gradient.  This report also called attention to the marked anisotropic resistivity of the purple lithium bronze  and its metal-to-insulator transition at about 24 K.

Hydrogen bronzes  were obtained in 1950 by Glemser and Lutz, by ambient-temperature reactions. The hydrogen in these compounds can be replaced by alkali metals by treatment with solutions of the corresponding halides.  Reactions are conducted in an autoclave at about 160 °C.

Classification 
Molybdenum bronzes are classified in three major families:
 Red bronzes with limiting composition , that is, :
 Lithium molybdenum red bronze  Reau and others.
 Potassium molybdenum red bronze  or 
 Cesium molybdenum red bronze 
 Potassium molybdenum red bronze  a semi-conductor.
 Blue bronzes, with limiting composition , that is, . Their electronic properties generally do not depend on the metal A.
 Potassium molybdenum blue bronze  or 
 Rubidium molybdenum blue bronze 
 Thallium molybdenum blue bronze 
 Purple bronzes, generally with limiting formula .  Their electronic properties depend strongly on the metal A.
 Lithium molybdenum purple bronze 
 Sodium molybdenum purple bronze  
 Potassium molybdenum purple bronze 
 Rubidium molybdenum purple bronze 
 Thallium molybdenum purple bronze 

The hydrogen molybdenum bronzes have similar appearances but different compositions:
 Hydrogen molybdenum orthorhombic blue bronze , 0.23 < x < 0.4 
 Hydrogen molybdenum monoclinic blue bronze , 0.85 < x < 1.4 
 Hydrogen molybdenum red bronze , 1.55 < x < 1.72 

Other molybdenum bronzes with anomalous electrical properties have been reported, which do not fit in these families.  These include 
 Tetragonal 
 .

Electrical and thermal properties

See also

References

Molybdenum compounds
Non-stoichiometric compounds
Transition metal oxides